Kim Price (born 9 December 1962) is a South African former cricketer who played as a slow left-arm orthodox bowler. She appeared in 26 One Day Internationals for South Africa between 1997 and 2000, and captained the side throughout that period. She played domestic cricket for Western Province.

References

External links
 
 

1962 births
Living people
Cricketers from Cape Town
South African women cricketers
South Africa women One Day International cricketers
South Africa women's national cricket team captains
Western Province women cricketers
20th-century South African women
21st-century South African women